The List of ethnic groups in Tajikistan is a page about the ethnic groups in Tajikistan by population through time.

Ethnic group in Tajikistan by population

See also
 Demographics of Tajikistan

References

 
Ethnic groups
Tajikistan